Sphaerolobium medium is a species of flowering plant in the family Fabaceae and is endemic to the south-west of Western Australia. It was first formally described in 1811 by Robert Brown in Aiton's Hortus Kewensis. The specific epithet (medium) means "intermediate between other species".

This pea is widespread in the south-west of Western Australia and is listed as "not threatened" by the Government of Western Australia Department of Biodiversity, Conservation and Attractions.

References 

medium
Fabales of Australia
Eudicots of Western Australia
Plants described in 1811
Taxa named by Robert Brown (botanist, born 1773)